João Manuel Gonçalves Lourenço  (born 5 March 1954) is an Angolan politician who has served as the 4th president of Angola since 26 September 2017. Previously, he was Minister of Defence from 2014 to 2017. In September 2018, he became the Chairman of the People's Movement for the Liberation of Angola (MPLA), the ruling party. He was the party's Secretary-General from 1998 to 2003.

João Lourenço was designated in December 2016 to occupy the party's number one position in the August 2017 legislative election. In terms of the 2010 constitution, "the individual heading the national list of the political party or coalition of political parties which receives the most votes in general elections ... shall be elected President of the Republic and Head of the Executive" (Article 109). As the MPLA won a majority of 150 seats, Lourenço automatically became President of Angola, succeeding José Eduardo dos Santos, who had been in power for 38 years. Lourenço was officially sworn into office on 26 September 2017.

Early life
Born in 1954, Lourenço grew up in a politically engaged family of ten children. His father, Sequeira João Lourenço (1923–1999), a native of Malanje, was a nurse and nationalist, who served three years of imprisonment in Portuguese Angola for illegal political activity. His mother, Josefa Gonçalves Cipriano Lourenço (1928–1997), a seamstress, was a native of Namibe. He received both a primary and secondary Portuguese-language education in Bié Province and Luanda.

Education and military career 
Lourenço studied at the Industrial Institute of Luanda and later participated in the liberation struggle in Ponta Negra, in August 1974, where he was part of the first group of MPLA soldiers to enter Angolan territory via Miconge, towards the city of Cabinda after the fall of the Portuguese colonial regime.

He began his military career fighting against the Portuguese in the Angolan War of Independence and fought as a member of the MPLA in the Angolan Civil War. Lourenço conducted his training in artillery and then became a political officer in the MPLA. In 1978, Lourenço traveled to the Soviet Union and studied at the Lenin Military-Political Academy, where he furthered his military training and completed a master's degree in Historical Sciences. He later returned to Angola in 1982. Now an artillery general, Lourenço turned towards politics and in 1984 was appointed as Governor of Moxico Province.

Political career 

Lourenço's early politics were mainly confined within the MPLA as an officer responsible for keeping guerrilla soldiers' morale high. Following his appointment as Governor of Moxico Province in 1984, he continued to rise through the ranks of the ruling party. He also served as the provincial commissioner of Moxico Province for the MPLA, president of the Regional Military Council of the 3rd Military Political Region, First Secretary of MPLA and Provincial Commissioner of Benguela Province. He was the MPLA's Secretary for Information from 1992 to 1997 and President of the MPLA Parliamentary Group in the National Assembly from 1993 to 1998.

At a party congress, he was elected as Secretary-General of the MPLA on 12 December 1998. His election was said to be linked to the favour of President José Eduardo dos Santos and it was thought that Lourenço could potentially succeed the long-ruling dos Santos at some point. However, after dos Santos said in 2001 that he would not seek re-election as president, Lourenço openly expressed an interest in becoming the MPLA's presidential candidate and thereby damaged his standing with dos Santos, who apparently had no real intention of leaving office, but had sought to expose political rivals. Juilão Mateus Paulo succeeded him as MPLA Secretary-General at a December 2003 party congress.

Lourenço was First Vice-President of the National Assembly from 2003 to 2014. He was appointed as Minister of Defense in April 2014, and he was designated as Vice-President of the MPLA in August 2016. In September 2018 he became the Chairman of the MPLA, replacing José Eduardo dos Santos.

Lourenço is very close to Elliott Broidy. Through Broidy's firm Circinus, Broidy allegedly received $6 million in January 2017 for lobbying on behalf of the interests of Angola by arranging meetings with Angolans and several Republican United States Senators including Ron Johnson and Tom Cotton, fostering a closer relationship between Washington, and Luanda, attempting to arrange meetings among Lourenço and Mike Pence and Donald Trump and allowing Lourenço to attend a September 2017 event at Trump's Mar-a-Lago club of which Broidy is a member, however, Lourenço did not attend.

In December 2016 the MPLA designated Lourenço as the party's top candidate in the 2017 legislative election. He was elected President of Angola on 23 August 2017 and took office on 26 September becoming the third President in the country's history. On 8 September 2018, he was elected President of the MPLA, Angola's ruling party since 1975, becoming its 5th party leader.

In June 2018, Lourenço legalised Angola's first LGBT collective. The following January, he replaced the 1886 colonial law banning homosexual acts, and prohibited discrimination against LGBT people. The reforms also permitted abortion in cases of rape or danger to mother or fetus.

Personal life 
He is married to Ana Afonso Dias Lourenço, a Member of Parliament of the MPLA and former Minister of Planning, who held a position at the World Bank in Washington D.C. until October 2016. They have six children, all of whom are currently active in the MPLA. Apart from his indigenous Umbundu language and Portuguese, he speaks Russian, Spanish, and English.  He is popularly nicknamed "Ti Mimoso" and "JLo".

Honours

Foreign honours 
 :
  First Class of the Order of the Most Ancient Welwitschia mirabilis (4 May 2018)
 : 
  Grand Collar of the Order of Prince Henry (22 November 2018)
: 
  Collar of the Order of Civil Merit (31 January 2023)

References

1954 births
20th century in Angola
20th-century Angolan people
21st-century Angolan people
Living people
Angolan Roman Catholics
MPLA politicians
People from Luanda
People of the Angolan Civil War
Defence ministers of Angola
Governors of Benguela
Governors of Moxico
Presidents of Angola
Leaders of political parties in Angola
Angolan expatriates in the Soviet Union
Lenin Military Political Academy alumni